R624 road may refer to:
 R624 road (Ireland)
 R624 (South Africa)